This is a demography of Argentina including population density, ethnicity, economic status and other aspects of the population.

Argentina ranks third in South America in total population and 33rd globally. The population density is 16.5 persons per square kilometer - well below the world average of 62 persons. Argentina's population growth rate in 2020 was estimated to be 0.35% annually, with a birth rate of 11.8 per 1,000 inhabitants and a mortality rate of 8.3 per 1,000 inhabitants.

The proportion of people under 15, at 23,5%, is slightly below the world average (25%), and the cohort of people 65 and older is relatively high, at 12.7%. The percentage of senior citizens in Argentina has long been second only to Uruguay in Latin America and well above the world average, which is currently 9.8%.

The median age is approximately 32 years and life expectancy at birth is of 78 years. According to an official cultural consumption survey conducted in 2006, 42.3% of Argentines speak English (though only 15.4% of those claimed to have a high level of English comprehension), 9.3% speak Portuguese and 5.9% speak Italian.

Cities

Argentina is highly urbanized, with the ten largest metropolitan areas accounting for half of the population, and fewer than one in ten living in rural areas. About 3 million people live in Buenos Aires proper, and including suburban Greater Buenos Aires the metropolitan area totals around 14 million - making it one of the 15 largest urban areas in the world. The metropolitan areas of Córdoba and Rosario have around 1.3 million inhabitants each, and six other cities (Mendoza, Tucumán, La Plata, Mar del Plata, Salta and Santa Fe) have at least half a million people each.

The population is unequally distributed amongst the provinces, with 61% living in the Pampa region (21% of the total area), including 17.5 million people in Buenos Aires Province, 4 million in Córdoba Province, and over 3 million each in Santa Fe Province and the Autonomous City of Buenos Aires. Eight other provinces each have over one million people: Mendoza, Tucumán, Salta, Entre Ríos, Misiones, Corrientes, Chaco, and Santiago del Estero. Tucumán is the most densely populated (with 75 inhabitants/km2, the only Argentine province more densely populated than the world average), while the southern province of Santa Cruz has just 1.4 inhabitant/km2.

In the mid-19th century, a large wave of immigration started to arrive to Argentina due to new constitutional policies that encouraged immigration, and issues in the countries the immigrants came from such as wars, poverty, hunger, famines, pursuit of a better life, among other reasons. The main immigration sources were from Europe, the countries from the Near and Middle East, Russia and Japan. In fact, the immigration torrent was so strong that Argentina eventually received the second-largest number of immigrants in the world, second only to the US and ahead of such immigrant receptor countries such as Canada, Brazil, Australia, etc.

Most of these European immigrants settled in the cities which offered jobs, education and other opportunities enabling them to enter the middle class. Many also settled in the growing small towns along the expanding railway system and since the 1930s many rural workers have moved to the big cities. 

Urban areas reflect the influence of European immigration, and most of the larger ones feature boulevards and diagonal avenues inspired by the redevelopment of Paris. Argentine cities were originally built in a colonial Spanish grid style, centered on a plaza overlooked by a cathedral and important government buildings. Many still retain this general layout, known as a damero, meaning checkerboard, since it is based on a pattern of square blocks. The city of La Plata, designed at the end of the 19th century by Pedro Benoit, combines the checkerboard layout with added diagonal avenues at fixed intervals, and was the first in South America with electric street lighting.

Provinces and districts

Historical census data

Sources: Pantelides and National Institute of Statistics and Census of Argentina

Vital statistics
The table below gives an overview of the number of birth and deaths in Argentina during the past century. Several sources were combined to compile the table.

The number of births in 2021 (529,794) was 32% below the record set in 2014, while the number of deaths (436,799) was the highest ever recorded - though as the population of Argentina showed a five-fold increase during the past century, the birth rate in 2021 (11.6) was a record low while the death rate (9.5) rose to its highest since 1947 due to the COVID-19 pandemic. 

Birth rates were relatively stable from 1934 through 1980, and after declining stabilized from 1995 to 2015 - before again declining sharply since then.

Structure of the population
The population below the age of 15 in 2023 was 23.5%, 63.8% was between 15 and 64, while 12.7% was 65 or older.

Structure of the population (27 October 2010 census):

Structure of the population (1 July 2022 estimate) :

UN estimates
The Population Department of the United Nations prepared the following estimates of vital statistics of Argentina.

Other demographics statistics

Argentina's population continues to grow but at a slower rate because of its steadily declining birth rate. Argentina's fertility decline began earlier than in the rest of Latin America, occurring most rapidly between the early 20th century and the 1930s and then becoming more gradual.

Life expectancy has been improving, most notably among the young and the poor.

Demographic statistics according to the World Population Review.

One birth every 1 minute
One death every 1.4 minutes
One net migrant every 111 minutes
Net gain of one person every 3 minutes

Demographic statistics according to the CIA World Factbook, unless otherwise indicated.

Population
46,245,668 (2022 est.)

Ethnic groups
European (mostly Spanish and Italian descent) and Mestizo (mixed European and Amerindian ancestry), 97.2%
Amerindian, 2.4%
African, 0.4%
(2010 est.)

Age structure

0–14 years: 24.02% (male 5,629,188 /female 5,294,723)
15–24 years: 15.19% (male 3,539,021 /female 3,367,321)
25–54 years: 39.60% (male 9,005,758 /female 9,002,931)
55–64 years: 9.07% (male 2,000,536 /female 2,122,699)
65 years and over: 12.13% (male 2,331,679 /female 3,185,262) (2020 est.)

Median age
total: 32.4 years. Country comparison to the world: 107th
male: 31.1 years
female: 33.6 years (2020 est.)

Birth rate
11.8 births/1,000 population (2020 est.) Country comparison to the world: 109th

Death rate
8.3 deaths/1,000 population (2020 est.) Country comparison to the world: 108th

Total fertility rate
1.6 children born/woman (2020 est.) Country comparison to the world: 92nd

Net migration rate
-0.1 migrant(s)/1,000 population (2018 est.) Country comparison to the world: 101st

Population growth rate
0.35% (2020 est.) Country comparison to the world: 121st

Life expectancy at birth
total population: 78.3 years. Country comparison to the world: 74th
male: 75.2 years
female: 81.6 years (2022 est.)

Infant mortality rate
total: 8.4 deaths/1,000 live births (2020 est.)
male: 9.2 deaths/1,000 live births (2020 est.)
female: 7.6 deaths/1,000 live births (2020 est.)

Languages
Spanish (official), Italian, Portuguese, English, German, French, indigenous (Mapudungun, Quechua)

Religions
Roman Catholicism 66%, Protestantism 10%, No Religion 21%, Other 3%

Population distribution
One-third of the population lives in Buenos Aires; pockets of agglomeration occur throughout the northern and central parts of the country; Patagonia to the south remains sparsely populated

Dependency ratios
total dependency ratio: 54.3
youth dependency ratio: 36.0
elderly dependency ratio: 18.2
potential support ratio: 5.5 (2021 est.)

Urbanization
urban population: 92.5% of total population (2020)
rate of urbanization: 0.97% annual rate of change (2020–25 est.)

Literacy
definition: age 15 and over can read and write (2016 est.)
total population: 99.1%
male: 99.1%
female: 99.1% (2016 est.)

School life expectancy (primary to tertiary education)
total: 18 years
male: 16 years
female: 19 years (2016)

Unemployment, youth ages 15–24
total: 18.3%. Country comparison to the world: 71st
male: 15.6%
female: 22.8% (2014 est.)

Sex ratio
at birth: 1.07 male(s)/female
0–14 years: 1.06 male(s)/female
15–24 years: 1.06 male(s)/female
25–54 years: 1 male(s)/female
55–64 years: 0.94 male(s)/female
65 years and over: 0.57 male(s)/female
total population: 0.98 male(s)/female (2017 est.)

Ethnic groups

Indigenous peoples

According to the data of INDEC's Complementary Survey of Indigenous Peoples (ECPI) 2004–2005, 600,000 officially recognized indigenous persons (about 1.4% of the total population) reside in Argentina. The most numerous of these communities are the Mapuches, who live mostly in the south, the Kollas and Wichís, from the northwest, and the Guaranis and Qom, who live mostly in the northeast.
In the census of 2010, 955,032 people self recognized as indigenous or descendants of indigenous peoples, thus representing 2.4% of the national population. This is without prejudice that more than half of the population has at least one indigenous ancestor, although in most cases family memory lost that origin.

Afro-Argentines

Since 2013, November 8 has been celebrated as the National Day of Afro-Argentines and African Culture. The date was chosen to commemorate the recorded date for the death of María Remedios del Valle, a rabona and guerrilla fighter, who served with the Army of the North in the war of Independence.

The black population in Argentina declined since the middle 19th century from 15% of the total population in 1857 (Blacks and Mulatto people), to less than 0.5% at present (mainly mulattoes and immigrants from Cape Verde).

Afro-Argentines were up to a third of the population during colonial times, most of them were slaves brought from Africa to work for the criollos. The 1813 Assembly abolished slavery and led to the Freedom of Wombs Law of 1813, which automatically freed slaves' children at birth. Many Afro-Argentines contributed to the independence of Argentina such as María Remedios del Valle who is known as "La Madre de la Patria" (mother of the fatherland in English) and Sgt. Juan Bautista Cabral. Also there is a debate, among the historians, as to whether or not Bernardino Rivadavia, the first president of the United Provinces of the Río de la Plata (Present Argentina) had African ancestors.

Immigration to Argentina

European settlement
As with other areas of new settlement such as Canada, Australia, the United States, Brazil, and New Zealand, Argentina is considered a country of immigrants. When it is considered that Argentina was second only to the United States (27 million of immigrants) in the number of immigrants received, even ahead of such other areas of new settlement like Canada, Brazil and Australia; and that the country was scarcely populated following its independence, the impact of the immigration to Argentina becomes evident.

In the last national census, based on self-identification, 952,032 Argentines (2.4% of the population) declared to be Amerindians. Most of the 6.2 million European immigrants arriving between 1850 and 1950, regardless of origin, settled in several regions of the country. Due to this large-scale European immigration, Argentina's population more than doubled.

The majority of these European immigrants came from Spain, Germany, Italy, England, Portugal, Brazil, France, Switzerland, Wales, Scotland, Poland, Albania, Yugoslavia, Czechoslovakia, the Austro-Hungarian Empire, the Ottoman Empire, Russia, Ukraine, Denmark, Sweden, Finland, Norway, Belgium, Luxembourg, the Netherlands, Romania, Bulgaria, Armenia, Greece, Lithuania, Estonia, and Latvia.

There was also a substantial number of people fleeing to Argentina in 1945 from Nazi Germany after its loss of World War II in order to escape persecution. It is believed that more than 12,000 Nazis fled to Argentina, with many having been listed to have Swiss bank accounts.

Italian population in Argentina arrived mainly from the northern Italian regions varying between Piedmont, Veneto and Lombardy, later from Campania and Calabria;
Spanish immigrants were mainly Galicians and Basques.
Thousands of immigrants also came from France (notably Béarn and the Northern Basque Country), Germany, Switzerland, Denmark, Sweden, Norway, Greece, Portugal, Finland, Russia and the United Kingdom. The Welsh settlement in Patagonia, known as Y Wladfa, began in 1865; mainly along the coast of Chubut Province. In addition to the main colony in Chubut, a smaller colony was set up in Santa Fe and another group settled at Coronel Suárez, southern Buenos Aires Province. Of the 50,000 Patagonians of Welsh descent, about 5,000 are Welsh speakers. The community is centered on the cities of Gaiman, Trelew and Trevelin.

Recent immigrants

According to the INDEC 1,531,940 of the Argentine resident population in 2001 were born outside Argentina, representing 4.22% of the total Argentine resident population. In 2010, 1,805,957 of the Argentine resident population were born outside Argentina, representing 4.50% of the total Argentine resident population.

Illegal immigration has been a recent factor in Argentine demographics. Most illegal immigrants come from Bolivia and Paraguay, countries which border Argentina to the north. Smaller numbers arrive from Peru and Ecuador.
The Argentine government estimates that 750,000 inhabitants lack official documents and has launched a program called Patria Grande ("Greater Homeland") to encourage illegal immigrants to regularize their status; so far over 670,000 applications have been processed under the program.

Languages

The official language of Argentina is Spanish, and it is spoken by practically the entire population in several different accents.  The most common variation of Spanish in Argentina is the Rioplatense Spanish, and it is so named because it evolved in the central areas around the Río de la Plata basin. Its distinctive feature is widespread voseo, the use of the pronoun vos instead of tú for the second person singular. Additionally, the Argentinian accent sounds identical to Portuguese in the words that begin with 'll' or 'yo', and all the words in Portuguese that begin with 'ch'. For example, the following sentence English: What is your name? Portuguese: como se chama? Spanish: Como se llama? - 'chama' & 'llama' are pronounced as though they were spelled "Shama"in both Argentinian Spanish and Portuguese. Moreover, the sound shift of all of the words in Spanish that begin with "ll" or 'y' but sound like 'sh' i.e., 'llorar' 'llama, 'llegar' & 'yo'. In Portuguese the words that begin with 'ch' always sound like 'sh'. There are many more words like these shown above. The mutual intelligibility between Spanish and Portuguese is already high, but the 'sh' sound increases the intelligibility between both languages even more.

Non-indigenous minority languages
Many Argentines also speak other European languages (Italian, German, Portuguese, French, Welsh, Swedish and Croatian, as examples) due to the vast number of immigrants from Europe that came to Argentina.

English language is a required subject in many schools, and there are also many private English-teaching academies and institutions. Young people have become accustomed to English through movies and the Internet, and knowledge of the language is also required in most jobs, so most middle-class children and teenagers now speak, read and/or understand it with various degrees of proficiency. According to an official cultural consumption survey conducted in 2006, 42.3% of Argentines claim to speak some English (though only 15.4% of those claimed to have a high level of English comprehension).

There are sources of around one million Levantine Arabic speakers in Argentina, as a result of immigration from the Middle East, mostly from Syria and Lebanon.

Standard German is spoken by around 500,000 Argentines of German ancestry, though the number may be as high as 3,800,000 according to some sources. German is the third or fourth most spoken language in Argentina.

There is a prosperous community of Argentine Welsh-speakers of approximately 25,000 in the province of Chubut, in the Patagonia region, who descend from 19th century immigrants.

Religion

The Constitution guarantees freedom of religion, but until 1994 the President and Vice President had to be Catholic. The society, culture, and politics of Argentina are deeply imbued with Roman Catholicism.

Estimates for the number of Roman Catholics vary from 70% of the population, to as much as 90%. The CIA Factbook lists 92% of the country is Catholic, but only 20% are practicing regularly or weekly at a church service. The Jewish population is about 300,000 (around 0.75% of the population), the community numbered about 400,000 after World War II, but the appeal of Israel and economic and cultural pressures at home led many to leave; recent instability in Israel has resulted in a modest reversal of the trend since 2003. Muslim Argentines number about 500,000–600,000, or approximately 1.5% of the population; 93% of them are Sunni. Buenos Aires is home to one of the largest mosques in Latin America. A study from 2010 found that approximately 11% of Argentines are non-religious, including those who believe in God, though not religion, agnostics (4%) and atheists (5%). Overall, 24% attended religious services regularly. Protestants were the only group in which a majority regularly attended services.

Gallery

See also
 National Institute of Statistics and Census of Argentina
 Racism in Argentina

References

External links
 Population cartogram of Argentina